Paris-Willouby is a 2015 French dramatic comedy film written and directed by Arthur Delaire and Quentin Reynaud in their directorial debut. The film stars Isabelle Carré, Stéphane De Groodt and Alex Lutz.

Plot 
A blended family set off on a road trip for a funeral.

Cast 
 Isabelle Carré as Claire Lacourt
 Stéphane De Groodt as Maurice Guilby
 Alex Lutz as Marc Lacourt
 Joséphine Japy as Lucie Guilby
 Solal Forte as Alexandre le Tallec
 Aminthe Audiard as Prune Guilby
 Jennifer Decker as Angélique
 Daniel Hanssens as Human Resources VP
 Maëva Youbi as Julie Duché
 Guy Marchand as Police officer 1
 Quentin Reynaud as Police officer 2
 Arthur Delaire as receptionist
 Jean-Benoît Ugeux as the priest

References

External links 
 

2015 films
2010s road comedy-drama films
2010s French-language films
French road comedy-drama films
2015 directorial debut films
2010s French films